Gihanga is a town in the Commune of Gihanga in Bubanza Province in northwestern Burundi.
It is the capital of the Commune of Gihanga.

References

External links
Satellite map at Maplandia.com

Populated places in Burundi
Bubanza Province